The bare-cheeked trogon (Apaloderma aequatoriale) is a species of bird in the family Trogonidae found in the rainforests of central Africa.

Description 
The bare-cheeked trogon has bare yellow skin below its eyes and between its eyes and bill. The head, back and upper tail are green, the chest is red, and it has finely barred wings. 

The vocalisations are described as a series of six to ten descending coo notes.

Distribution and habitat 
It is found in Cameroon, Central African Republic, Republic of the Congo, Democratic Republic of the Congo, Equatorial Guinea, Gabon, and Nigeria. The bare-cheeked trogon lives in interior regions of lowland rainforests.

References

bare-cheeked trogon
Birds of Central Africa
bare-cheeked trogon
Taxonomy articles created by Polbot